The West Central Senior Lacrosse League (WCSLL) is a men's Senior C amateur box lacrosse league sanctioned by the British Columbia Lacrosse Association in Canada.

Officially named the West Central Senior 'C' Lacrosse Association, it is usually referred to as the West Central League or just simply the 'C' League and consists of nine teams based in cities located in the Greater Vancouver area - all playing the majority of their games from a central venue located at Port Coquitlam Arena. The league schedule is typically contested from mid-April until early August.

League history 

Harry George Woolley founded the West Central Lacrosse League (WCLL) in fall 2002. Earlier in 2002, while being commissioner of the West Coast Senior Lacrosse Association (WCSLA) Senior B league, Woolley saw 55 players cut with nowhere to play. He completed the necessary paperwork and helped organize the WCLL get off the ground.

The vision Woolley had in establishing the West Central Lacrosse League (WCLL) was to create a recreational league that any lacrosse enthusiast could join.

Original Teams
The West Central League started play in 2003 with four teams: the Abbotsford Attack, Port Coquitlam Hitmen, Port Moody Express, and Vancouver Vipers.

The Port Coquitlam Hitmen were founded by Scott Parsons. The Port Moody franchise originated after the 2002 Alcan Cup in Vernon. The Port Coquitlam Knights Senior B team, which was started by Juggy Gales and would have received the bronze medal as they did the year before in Prince George, realized that things needed to change. Juggy told Glen "Moose" Scott (Prince George senior lacrosse commissioner) at the Alcan Cup tournament that he would be putting a Port Moody Senior C team in for the next year's Alcan Cup. The West Central League originally excluded Port Moody from the league; Surrey, Abbotsford, Vancouver and Port Coquitlam being the original teams. Port Moody, despite having a full roster and financial support, was told that this was a four team league at the league's first meeting. Surrey then later backed out and Port Moody stepped in to take their place. The original proposed name for the team was the Port Moody Beasts, but this was soon dropped in favour of the Port Moody Express. The Abbotsford Attack were started by Cam Janzen and Tom Potter as they wanted to have a box team for all the Abbotsford field players to keep their skills up over the off-season. Terry(the maniac) Kirstiuk was responsible for founding the Vancouver Vipers (named after the former Vancouver Senior B team from the late 1990s), a squad which struggled through its first season with short-benches and an inexperienced roster.

Seasons

2003
The first league match was played on May 10, 2003, a 9-9 tie in which Kelly Scott of Abbotsford Attack scored the league's first goal (against Port Coquitlam Hitmen). Port Moody Express and Port Coquitlam Hitmen were the dominant teams during the inaugural season, finishing 1st and 2nd respectively in the regular season standings and both met in the playoff finals with Port Coquitlam defeating Port Moody 12-10 in overtime to win the Gale Lloyd Trophy - symbolic of the league's playoff championship. In the league's consolation bronze game, the  Vancouver Vipers, who went winless during the regular season, pulled off a 7-4 upset to defeat the Abbotsford Attack.

2004
The 2004 regular season basically saw a repeat finish of the previous year, although Port Coquitlam finished tied for points with Abbotsford. Vancouver Vipers picked up its first and only win of the regular season at the expense of Port Coquitlam. Port Moody and Port Coquitlam met again in the playoff championship - with the game going into overtime but this time Port Moody walking away with the Gale Lloyd trophy in an exciting 9-8 victory. Abbotsford defeated Vancouver 11-7 in the re-match for the bronze medal game.

One major change which occurred prior to the 2004 campaign was the adoption of one central arena location in Port Coquitlam for all games regardless which teams were playing. In the inaugural season, a different team would host games each weekend at their own home arena. Players complained about the travel (especially back-to-back Saturday-Sunday games played in Abbotsford and Vancouver-Kerrisdale) and confusion over scheduling locations, so the decision was made to centralize everything out of Port Coquitlam Arena. Since then, just over 80% of all league games have been played at Port Coquitlam Arena - with the remainder re-scheduled elsewhere when not available.

2005
On February 23, 2005 the North Shore Indians from North Vancouver were approved and joined as the league's first expansion team. Port Coquitlam and Port Moody met yet again in the playoff finals - this time Port Coquitlam taking the trophy home with a 10-8 win.

In October 2005, during the off-season, Vancouver's executive decided to rename the team the Burrards to keep in line with all other Vancouver box lacrosse teams from minor up through to senior level.

2006
In 2006, the league's fourth campaign, Port Moody dropped the unpopular PoCoMo moniker and proceeded to shellshock the league with its 10-0 start. Port Moody walked away with the championship in an easy 11-3 win versus North Shore, while Abbotsford took the bronze against Vancouver.

Despite the overwhelming dominance of Port Moody (who went on to win the Alcan Cup Invitational Senior C Championship held in Prince George and then capped it up the following week with winning British Columbia Senior C provincial championships in Richmond and New Westminster), the league saw the closest parity and balanced play between teams since the league started.

2007
The first half of the 2007 season was fairly close, as on any given day depending on who showed up any team could beat another. As the season progressed however, Port Coquitlam, Port Moody, and North Shore were able to fortify themselves prior to the roster deadline with signing cuts to boost their fortunes in the standings as Abbotsford and Vancouver slid downwards from remaining with pretty much the same intact rosters for the entire season.

In the bronze medal game played the following day, the Abbotsford Attack held a 7-4 lead after forty minutes but then the Indians mounted yet another of their third-period comebacks. Abbotsford were able to hang on for a 9-8 victory over the North Shore Indians.

The championship game featured the fourth time the Port Moody Express and Port Coquitlam Hitmen had met in the finals - and once again it was an interesting and exciting game. Port Coquitlam held narrow 1-goal leads after each of the first two period, but Port Moody were then able to outscore the Hitmen 6-4 in the third-period to win the championship 15-14.

The following weekend, four teams traveled to Prince George to compete in the British Columbia Senior 'C' Provincial and Alcan Cup tournaments. In a tournament which none of the host teams were able to make the finals, Port Moody Express and Port Coquitlam participated in the provincials with Port Moody losing to Kelowna Raiders (Okanagan Xtreme League) in the gold medal game. In the Alcan Cup, North Shore Indians and Vancouver Burrards finished ahead of their Prince George opposition to meet for the gold medal, with the Indians taking the gold 10-4 in the championship game.

2008
On February 21, 2008 the league expanded when the West Van Outlaws from West Vancouver were accepted into the league as its sixth team. Along with the new team, the regular season schedule was increased from 12 to 15 games and the playoff final made into a best-of-three series. Expansion required the league to change its scheduling so that its Saturday night double-headers involving four teams became triple-headers involving all six teams and the bye weeks eliminated.

Port Moody Express and Port Coquitlam Hitmen battled neck and neck throughout the season for first place.

In the championship finals between Port Moody Express and North Shore Indians, the defending champion Express swept the best-of-three series 10-8 and 12-6 to win the Gale Lloyd Trophy for the third year in a row, and the fourth time in five seasons.

Port Moody Express and North Shore Indians then traveled the following week to Kelowna to represent the league in the British Columbia Senior 'C' Provincials. Port Moody won all their games in the round-robin section but lost in the gold medal game to the Kelowna Raiders. North Shore finished in third place in the four-team tournament, ahead of Vernon Royals of the Okanagan Xtreme League. In the Alcan Cup, played in Prince George the same weekend, the Vancouver Burrards were unable to repeat their silver medal appearance from the year before, losing to Regina Heat and Prince George BX Pub Bandits to finish in fifth place with a record of 1 win and 2 losses.

2009
The league saw further change during the off-season when it expanded to eight teams on February 26, 2009. The Coquitlam Cobras and Ladner Pioneers were accepted into the league as expansion teams while the Abbotsford Attack (now devoid of its Ladner-based players) moved across the Fraser River to Maple Ridge to become the Ridge Attack - later going by the name Maple Ridge Attack in 2010.

Port Moody Express repeated as British Columbia Senior 'C' provincial champions when they defeated the Armstrong Shamrocks and Kelowna Raiders in the three-team provincial tournament held in Armstrong during the August 14–16, 2009 weekend. In the Alcan Cup the following weekend, the Vancouver Burrards travelled to Prince George as the only visiting team entering the five-team tournament. Vancouver – who were reinforced with players picked up from the Port Moody Express and Armstrong Shamrocks – cruised through the round-robin section with a record of three wins and one loss against their Prince George opposition which then advanced them to the gold medal game for the second time in three years. They faced a re-match versus Prince George Shooters Pub Devils, against whom they had lost the previous day, but this time won 8-7 and took home their first Alcan cup title in five years.

2013
The league expanded back to eight teams in 2013 when Burnaby Lakers and Richmond Roadrunners joined. Vancouver Burrards adopted the North Shore Indians identity and wore their uniforms.

2016
The league expanded to nine teams in 2016 with the addition of the Mission Cedar Kings. Previously denied use of the Adanacs name when they joined the league in 2009, the Coquitlam Cobras were renamed Coquitlam Adanacs in 2016 to reflect the universal naming of all Coquitlam lacrosse teams from minor programmes through into senior leagues under the Adanacs name starting that year.

Teams

Current team name changes 
 North Shore Indians - originally known as Vancouver Vipers (2003-2005) and Vancouver Burrards (2006-2012)
 Port Moody Express - called PoCoMo Express in 2005 season
 Ridge Attack - originally known as Abbotsford Attack (2003-2008)
 Coquitlam Cobras - originally known as Coquitlam Cobras (2009-2015)

Former teams 
 North Shore Indians (2005-2009) - folded
 West Van Outlaws (2008-2009) - folded

League Executive
League Commissioners
 Harry Woolley (pre-season of 2003)
 Scott Parsons (2003–2004)
 Patty Bensmiller (2005)
 Trish Proulx (2006–2009)
 Keith Armstrong (2010–present)
Chairmen of Board of Governors
 Terry Kirstiuk (2003)
 Scott Parsons (2004)
 Terry Kirstiuk (2005–2006)
 Brock Rose (2007–2008)
 Craig Baldridge (2009)
 Nick Thomas (2010–present)
Secretaries
 Trish Proulx (2003–2005)
 Sandi Comack (2006–present)
Treasurers
 Trish Proulx (2003–2008)
 Betty Selezinka (2009–present)
Statisticians
 Patty Bensmiller (2003)
 Lenora Murrin (2004–2005)
 Dave Stewart-Candy (2006–2008)
 Terry Kirstiuk (2009–present)
Provincial Co-ordinator
 Nick Thomas (2010–present)

Team Executives
Coquitlam Cobras
 Tyler Dunlop (governor / team manager) 2009–present
 Shane Hyde (general manager) 2010–present

Ladner Pioneers
 Mike McIntosh (governor / team manager) 2009–present

Ridge Attack (Abbotsford 2003-2008)
 Cam Janzen (governor) 2003
 Tom Potter (team manager) 2003, (governor) 2004-2005
 Brian Danilkiewicz (team manager) 2004-2005, (governor / general manager) 2006–present
 Mike McIntosh (team manager) 2006-2007

Port Coquitlam Hitmen
 Scott Parsons (governor / team manager) 2003-2004
 Paul Horn (governor / team manager) 2005
 Jamie Hurst (governor) 2006
 Rich Gareau (team manager) 2006
 Mike Gray (governor) 2007–present
 Tom Stevens (president) 2007–present
 Betty Selezinka (team manager) 2007–present

Port Moody Express
 Dave Wisniewski (governor / general manager) 2003-2006
 Craig Baldridge (governor) 2007–present
 Nick Thomas (general manager) 2007-2009; (president) 2010–present
 Jeff Dutkewich (general manager) 2010–present

Vancouver Burrards
 Terry Kirstiuk (governor / general manager) 2003-2004; 2008–present
 Terry Kirstiuk (governor) 2005-2007
 Dave Stewart-Candy (team manager) 2005-2007; (assistant governor) 2008–2010
 Andrew Rennie (assistant manager) 2009–2010

Former teams
North Shore Indians (2005–2009)
 Dave Jacobs (governor) 2005-2009
 Stewart Jacobs (president / general manager) 2005-2009

West Van Outlaws (2008–2009)
 Simon Baker (governor) 2008-2009
 Stee Baker (assistant governor) 2008-2009

Regular season standings
W = Wins, L = Losses, T = Ties, OL = Overtime Losses, GF = Goals For, GA = Goals Against, PTS = Points, AS = Assists, PEN = Penalties, PIM = Penalty Minutes
Vancouver forfeited game to Port Moody 1-0 on May 10, 2003

PoCoMo forfeited game 1-0 to Vancouver on July 23, 2005. Final PoCoMo vs. Vancouver game not played; result 0-0 tie

Port Moody forfeited game 1-0 to North Shore on July 16, 2006

Abbotsford forfeited game 0-0 to Vancouver on April 12, 2008

Ridge forfeited game 1-0 to Port Coquitlam on June 11, 2010

Burnaby Lakers forfeited game to Port Coquitlam Hitmen 1-0 on April 20, 2012

Playoffs
2003 SEASON
SEMI-FINALS: Port Moody Express defeated Vancouver Vipers 18-6; Port Coquitlam Hitmen defeated Abbotsford Attack 13-12
CONSOLATION GAME: Vancouver Vipers defeated Abbotsford Attack 7-4
CHAMPIONSHIP GAME: Port Coquitlam Hitmen defeated Port Moody Express 12-10 (OT)
2004 SEASON
SEMI-FINALS: Port Moody Express defeated Vancouver Vipers 13-6; Port Coquitlam Hitmen defeated Abbotsford Attack 8-5
CONSOLATION GAME: Abbotsford Attack defeated Vancouver Vipers 11-7
CHAMPIONSHIP GAME: Port Moody Express defeated Port Coquitlam Hitmen 9-8 (OT)
2005 SEASON
SEMI-FINALS: Port Coquitlam Hitmen defeated North Shore Indians 11-10; PoCoMo Express defeated Vancouver Vipers 9-7
CONSOLATION GAME: North Shore Indians defeated Vancouver Vipers 17-5
CHAMPIONSHIP GAME: Port Coquitlam Hitmen defeated PoCoMo Express 10-8
2006 SEASON
SEMI-FINALS: Port Moody Express defeated Abbotsford Attack 10-5; North Shore Indians defeated Vancouver Burrards 9-5
CONSOLATION GAME: Abbotsford Attack defeated Vancouver Burrards 8-7
CHAMPIONSHIP GAME: Port Moody Express defeated North Shore Indians 11-3
2007 SEASON
SEMI-FINALS: Port Moody Express defeated Abbotsford Attack 8-4; Port Coquitlam Hitmen defeated North Shore Indians 7-2
CONSOLATION GAME: Abbotsford Attack defeated North Shore Indians 9-8
CHAMPIONSHIP GAME: Port Moody Express defeated Port Coquitlam Hitmen 15-14
2008 SEASON
SEMI-FINALS: Port Moody Express defeated West Van Outlaws 12-9; North Shore Indians defeated Port Coquitlam Hitmen 12-7
FIFTH PLACE GAME: Vancouver Burrards defeated Abbotsford Attack 8-7
THIRD PLACE GAME: Port Coquitlam Hitmen defeated West Van Outlaws 10-2
CHAMPIONSHIP SERIES: Port Moody Express defeated North Shore Indians 2 games to 0 (10-8; 12-6)
2009 SEASON
QUARTER-FINALS: Port Coquitlam Hitmen defeated Coquitlam Cobras 2 games to 1 (8-3; 3-5; 8-3); West Van Outlaws defeated Ridge Attack 2 games to 0 (9-7; 9-4)
SEMI-FINALS: Port Moody Express defeated West Van Outlaws 2 games to 1 (6-9; 6-5 OT; 7-5); Port Coquitlam Hitmen defeated Ladner Pioneers 2 games to 1 (12-8 OT; 4-10; 7-5)
CHAMPIONSHIP SERIES: Port Moody Express defeated Port Coquitlam Hitmen 2 games to 1 (6-3; 5-6; 7-3)
2010 SEASON
SEMI-FINALS: Coquitlam Cobras defeated Ladner Pioneers 2 games to 1 (8-7, 5-6, 9-5); Port Moody Express defeated Maple Ridge Attack 2 games to 0 (10-5, 9-6 OT)
CHAMPIONSHIP SERIES: Port Moody Express defeated Coquitlam Cobras 2 games to 0 (9-5, 9-6 OT)
2011 SEASON
SEMI-FINALS: Port Moody Express defeated Port Coquitlam Hitmen 2 games to 0 (6-4, 8-5); Coquitlam Cobras defeated Ladner Pioneers 2 games to 1 (6-10, 9-7, 9-5)
CHAMPIONSHIP SERIES: Coquitlam Cobras defeated Port Moody Express 2 games to 1 (10-3, 3-7, 8-7)
2012 SEASON
SEMI-FINALS: Port Moody Express defeated Ridge Attack 2 games to 0 (14-6, 13-9); Ladner Pioneers defeated Coquitlam Cobras 2 games to 1 (7-5, 8-13, 12-6)
FINALS: Port Moody Express defeated Ladner Pioneers 2 games to 0 (10-8, 16-6)
2013 SEASON
QUARTER-FINALS: Ladner Pioneers defeated Ridge Attack 10-8; Richmond Roadrunners defeated Port Coquitlam Hitmen 9-4
SEMI-FINALS: Coquitlam Cobras defeated Ladner Pioneers 2 games to 1 (11-10, 6-9, 9-6); Richmond Roadrunners defeated Port Moody Express 2 games to 1 (5-10, 11-10, 12-10)
FINALS: Coquitlam Cobras defeated Richmond Roadrunners 2 games to 0 (10-8, 10-8)
2014 SEASON
QUARTER-FINALS: Port Moody Express defeated Vancouver Burrard Indians 15-5; Port Coquitlam Hitmen defeated Ridge Attack 13-9
SEMI-FINALS: Richmond Roadrunners defeated Port Coquitlam Hitmen 2 games to 0 (9-7; 2-11); Coquitlam Cobras defeated Port Moody Express 2 games to 1 (3-11; 11-8; 9-7)
FINALS: Coquitlam Cobras defeated Richmond Roadrunners 2 games to 0 (10-6; 8-4)
2015 SEASON
QUARTER-FINALS: Richmond Roadrunners defeated Port Coquitlam Hitmen 8-7; Ridge Attack defeated North Shore Indians 11-9
SEMI-FINALS: Ridge Attack defeated Coquitlam Cobras 2 games to 0 (8-4, 8-6); Port Moody Express defeated Richmond Roadrunners 2 games to 1 (7-8, 9-2, 10-6)
FINALS: Port Moody Express defeated Ridge Attack 2 games to 1 (9-13, 11-10, 9-4)
2016 SEASON
QUARTER-FINALS: Coquitlam Adanacs defeated Port Coquitlam Hitmen 10-4; Ridge Attack defeated North Shore Indians 12-5
SEMI-FINALS: Port Moody Express defeated Coquitlam Adanacs 2 games to 0 (11-10 OT, 8-6); Ridge Attack defeated Richmond Roadrunners 2 games to 1 (9-8, 5-6 OT, 10-9)
FINALS: Port Moody Express defeated Ridge Attack (5-4, 6-7, 6-4*) - Deciding game between Port Moody Express and Ridge Attack was abandoned due to unsafe floor conditions in the third period with Port Moody leading 6-4; Port Moody claimed the championship

Playoff Champions

References

External links
WCSLL website

3